The 3rd ACTRA Awards were presented on March 2, 1974, at a ceremony hosted by Pierre Berton.

It marked the first time that the ceremony was broadcast by CBC Television, although that took place as a "highlights" show following the end of the event rather than as a live broadcast. It also marked the first time that ACTRA divided some categories up into separate awards for radio and television content, a process that would continue in future years.

Winners and nominees

References

1974 in Canadian television
1974 television awards
ACTRA Awards